Ed's Easy Diner is a casual restaurant chain based in the United Kingdom selling 1950s American diner style items.

History
The first Ed's Easy Diner was opened by Barry Margolis in London's Soho in 1987. In 2008, there were just three diners, all situated in London. As of April 2014, Ed's Easy Diner had 24 outlets, and by September 2016 they had 59. In October 2016, the struggling company experienced poor sales and over-expansion, and was purchased by Boparan Restaurant Holdings after it collapsed into administration. It is now a trading division of Boparan's Giraffe Restaurants.

After that deal closed, twenty six diners closed immediately, and almost four hundred jobs were lost;  thirty-three diners remained open, supporting seven hundred jobs. , the company held twenty four diners within the United Kingdom and their first branch in Soho closed its doors for the last time. Six more Ed's Diner locations were set to close in March 2019, due to reduced sales in the casual dining market.

, the company had eleven UK diners, and none in London. Also in 2021, it licensed its branding and some of its recipes for a frozen food line sold by Iceland.

See also

 Eddie Rockets
 Johnny Rockets
 List of hamburger restaurants

References

External links
 

1987 establishments in England
British brands
Fast-food chains of the United Kingdom
Restaurants established in 1987